Dona Maria Manuela (15 October 1527 – 12 July 1545) was the eldest daughter and second child of King John III of Portugal and his wife Catherine of Austria. She was Princess of Asturias and Duchess of Milan as the first wife of the future Philip II of Spain, and Princess of Portugal as heir presumptive to the Portuguese throne between 1527 and 1535.

Early life 
Maria was born in Coimbra on 15 October 1527 and was one of the two children of John III to survive childhood. In her youth, Maria received a humanistic education that was considered typical for a princess of her time.

Marriage and later life 
She married her double first cousin Philip II of Spain on 12 November 1543 at Salamanca. As she was to be married to the Prince of Asturias, heir apparent to the Spanish crown, and being an Infanta of Portugal, their wedding became one of the most remarkable in the history of Spain due to its opulence. Contemporary writers have left detailed descriptions of the journey from Madrid to Badajoz to Salamanca to receive the princess and of the luxuries she was given by the Duke of Medina Sidonia in Badajoz.

She gave birth to their son Carlos on 8 July 1545 in Valladolid, but died four days later due to a haemorrhage. She was initially buried in the Royal Chapel of Granada on 30 March 1549 but was later transferred to Royal Crypt of the Monastery of El Escorial.

Ancestry

Notes

References
Kamen, Henry: Philip of Spain. Yale University Press. 1998. .

|-

1527 births
1545 deaths
House of Aviz
Princes of Portugal
Princesses of Asturias
Duchesses of Milan
Austrian princesses
Deaths in childbirth
Burials in the Pantheon of Infantes at El Escorial
People from Coimbra
16th-century Portuguese people
16th-century Portuguese women
Wives of Philip II of Spain
Children of John III of Portugal
Daughters of kings